Phuc (Phúc with diacritics) can refer to:

People
 Phan Thi Kim Phuc
 Đặng Hữu Phúc (born 1953) is a Vietnamese pianist and composer best known for his film scores
 Nguyễn Phúc Luân (阮福㫻, 1733–1765) was a son of lord Nguyễn Phúc Khoát and father of Nguyễn Phúc Ánh
 Nguyễn Xuân Phúc (born 1954) is a Vietnamese politician and President of Vietnam

Places
 Phúc Yên Air Base
 Vĩnh Phúc Province

Others
 Trần Ngọc Gia Phúc (武服), a Vietnamese term that refers to a martial arts uniform